Platyactaea is a genus of crabs in the family Xanthidae, containing the following species:

 Platyactaea dovii (Stimpson, 1871)
 Platyactaea setigera (H. Milne Edwards, 1834)

References

Xanthoidea